Yousuf Al-Thunayyan (born November 18, 1963) is a former association football winger and attacking midfielder from Saudi Arabia. He spent all 21 seasons of his senior career at Al-Hilal FC.  A playmaker known for vision and technique, Al-Thunayyan was nicknamed "The Philosopher" for his dribbling, goal scoring, and playmaking skills. He has been regarded as the greatest player in Saudi Arabia and Asia of all time.

Club career
Al-Thunayan played his entire club career for Al-Hilal, joining the first team in 1984 and retiring in 2005 after winning a total of 24 titles with the club. On 14 December 2005, Al-Hilal hosted Valencia in his farewell match. Particular highlights are Asian Club Championship 1991 Winner and Asian Club Championship 1999-2000 Winner.

International career
During his active career, Al-Thunayan played 95 international matches and scored 33 goals for the Saudi Arabia national team. At the age of 34 he was selected for his only Football World Cup, and appeared in two games, scoring from the penalty spot in the 2–2 draw with South Africa. Yousuf represented Saudi Arabia in 3 consecutive AFC Asian Cup finals in 1988, 1992 and 1996, winning two out of these three.

1988 AFC Asian Cup (Qatar)

Yousuf took over the starting forward role mid way thru the tournament coached by Carlos Alberto Parreira.
He played vs Bahrain in Group stages which tied 1-1. He also played the important game vs China which Saudi Arabia won 1–0.
He played the Semi Finals vs Iran which Saudi Arabia won 1–0.
He also played in the Final vs South Korea which Saudi Arabia won on penalties.

1992 AFC Asian Cup (Japan)

He scored the goal in a stage game vs China which Saudis tied 1-1.
He also played the group stage game vs Qatar which Saudis again tied 1-1.
In the final group stage game, Yousuf scored a goal in a 4–0 rout of Thailand.
Yousuf led the team to defeat UAE 2–0 in Semi Finals.
Yousuf played whole Final game in which Saudi Arabia lost to Japan.

1992 King Fahd Cup, later known as FIFA Confederations Cup

The confederation cup was the last stop prior to Asian World Cup qualifiers. Saudi Arabia beat USA 3–0, with Yousuf scoring a goal.

1996 AFC Asian Cup (UAE)

Yousuf was on bench but was substituted in during the game against Iran, where Saudi Arabia lost 3–0.
A Quarter finals game against China started badly, with Saudi Arabia down 2–0. Yousuf scored a goal and made an assist and in end Saudi Arabia won the game 4–2.
In the Semi Finals game vs Iran, Saudi Arabia won the match on PK 4–3.
Saudi Arabia won 4–2 against UAE, the host nation, with Yousuf playing the whole game and scoring a critical first penalty shot.
This was a second continental Asian Cup for Yousuf and a third for Saudi Arabia.

1998 Arab Cup

Yousuf scored in the Semi Finals game 2–1 against Kuwait. In the Final game vs Qatar, he made an assist to clinch the title for Saudi Arabia.

1998 World Cup

As Saudi Arabia failed to qualify for the 1986 and 1990 world cup, Yousuf had only one chance to play on the World Cup near the end of his peak. He appeared as a substitute against Denmark where Saudi Arabia Lost 1–0.
Yousuf scored a penalty kick to earn Saudi Arabia a 2–2 draw vs South Africa, resulting in the solitary point for Saudi Arabia in 1998 world cup. He captained the team in the game.

International goals

Honours

Club
 Saudi Premier League : 1985, 1986, 1988, 1990, 1996, 1998, 2002
 Saudi King Cup : 1984, 1989
 Crown Prince Cup : 1995, 2000
 Saudi Federation Cup : 1987, 1996, 2000
 Saudi Founder's Cup : 2000
 AFC Champions League : 1991, 2000
 Asian Cup Winners Cup : 1997
 Asian Super Cup : 1997
 Arab Champions League : 1994, 1995
 Arab Super Cup : 2001
 Gulf Club Champions Cup : 1986, 1998

International
 AFC Asian Cup
 Winners (2) : 1988, 1996
 Runners-up (1) : 1992
 FIFA Confederations Cup
 Runners-Up (1) : 1992
 Gulf Cup of Nations
 Runners-up (1) : 1998
 Arab Nations Cup
 Winners (1) : 1998
 Runners-up (1) : 1992

Individual
 1986, 1991-92 Asian Club Championship  - Best player

Farewell match

References

External links

Image

1963 births
Living people
Saudi Arabian footballers
Saudi Arabia international footballers
1988 AFC Asian Cup players
1992 AFC Asian Cup players
1992 King Fahd Cup players
1996 AFC Asian Cup players
1998 FIFA World Cup players
AFC Asian Cup-winning players
Al Hilal SFC players
Asian Games medalists in football
Footballers at the 1986 Asian Games
Footballers at the 1990 Asian Games
Sportspeople from Riyadh
Association football wingers
Association football midfielders
Saudi Professional League players
Asian Games silver medalists for Saudi Arabia
Medalists at the 1986 Asian Games